In Ohio, State Route 275 may refer to:
Interstate 275 in Ohio, the only Ohio highway numbered 275 since about 1962
Ohio State Route 275 (1930s-1960s), now SR 245